ATSTEP is a Gaussian puff model for diagnosis and prognosis of the atmospheric dispersion, deposition, gamma radiation and doses of released radioactivity in case of accidents in nuclear power plants or during transport, and from dirty bombs.

It was developed by Forschungszentrum Karlsruhe (now Karlsruhe Institute of Technology, KIT), one of the largest national research centers in Germany, and is designed for running in the RODOS (Real-time On-line DecisiOn Support) system for nuclear emergency management. RODOS is operational at the German Federal Office for Radiation Protection (BfS), and test operational in many other European countries. More information on RODOS is available on the RODOS website here and on the ATSTEP model here.

See also

Bibliography of atmospheric dispersion modeling
Air pollution dispersion terminology
Atmospheric dispersion modeling
List of atmospheric dispersion models

Further reading
For those who are unfamiliar with air pollution dispersion modelling and would like to learn more about the subject, it is suggested that either one of the following books be read:

 www.crcpress.com
 

Atmospheric dispersion modeling